Cyprus competed in the Eurovision Song Contest 1998, held on 9 May 1998 at the National Indoor Arena in Birmingham, United Kingdom. The Cyprus Broadcasting Corporation (CyBC) organised a public selection process to determine its entry for the contest. Eight songs competed in the national final, held on 11 March 1998, where a jury chose the winning song. Michalis Hatzigiannis with the song "Genesis" received the most votes and was selected to represent the nation in the contest. Hatzigiannis performed 17th at the international contest and at the close of the voting process, finished in 11th place, receiving 37 points from 10 countries.

Background

It then participated yearly, only missing the 1988 contest when its selected song "Thimame" by Yiannis Dimitrou was disqualified for being previously released. Cyprus' least successful result was in  when it placed last with the song "Tora zo" by Elpida, receiving only four points in total.

Before Eurovision

National final 

The national final was held on 11 March 1998 at the Monte Caputo Nightclub in Limassol, hosted by Marina Maleni and Loukas Hamatsos. An 11 member committee assembled by CyBC selected eight songs to compete in the final out of the 53 entries received by the broadcaster. The winner of the final was chosen by an expert jury.

At Eurovision
The Eurovision Song Contest 1998 took place at the National Indoor Arena in Birmingham, United Kingdom on 9 May 1998. According to the Eurovision rules, the 25-country participant list for the contest was composed of: the winning country from the previous year's contest; the 17 countries, other than the previous year's winner, which had obtained the highest average number of points over the last five contests; and any countries which had not participated in the previous year's content. Following confirmation of the participant list, the running order for the contest was decided by a draw held on 13 November 1998; Cyprus was assigned position 17, following  and preceding . Heading into the final of the contest, BBC reported that bookmakers ranked the entry joint 20th out of the 25 entries.

Voting
The same voting system in use since 1975 was again implemented for the contest, with each country providing 1–8, 10 and 12 points to their 10 highest-ranking songs, with countries not allowed to vote for themselves. For the first time however, the contest results were determined predominantly by public voting via telephone, following a successful trial among five countries the previous year; an eight-member back-up jury was also assembled in case technical failures rendered the telephone votes invalid. The use of televoting caused phone lines in Cyprus to be jammed as viewers attempted to cast their votes using the 60 phone lines assigned to the contest. Despite receiving over 150,000 calls for votes, only 5,000 were registered during the five-minute voting window.

References

Further reading

 

 

1998
Countries in the Eurovision Song Contest 1998
Eurovision